Acrobasis subflavella is a species of snout moth in the genus Acrobasis. It was described by Hiroshi Inoue in 1982. It is found in Japan.

References

Moths described in 1982
Acrobasis
Moths of Japan